Soliz or Solíz is a surname. Notable people with the surname include:

Hermán Solíz (born 1982), Bolivian football defender
Jacqueline Solíz (born 1964), Bolivian sprinter
Nelvin Solíz (born 1989), Bolivian football midfielder
Óscar Soliz (born 1985), Bolivian road racing cyclist 
Steve Soliz (born 1971), American baseball player and coach

See also
Solis (disambiguation)
Soliz-Baca House